The Tamil Nadu State Film Award for Best Cinematographer is given by the state government as part of its annual Tamil Nadu State Film Awards for Tamil  (Kollywood) films.

The list

See also
 Tamil cinema
 Cinema of India

References

Actor
Awards for best cinematography